Věra Lišková (20 September 1924, Prague – 7 June 1985, Prague) was a Czech glass artist. She is known for pioneering the use of borosilicate glass or pyrex in glass art.

Education and career
Lišková studied at the State Graphic School in Prague until it closed due to World War II. She then studied at the School of Applied Arts in Prague and graduated in 1949.

She then became a designer of functional glassware, working for companies such as Vienna-based J. & L. Lobmeyr and Moser.

Lišková began making borosilicate glass sculptures in the late 1966. Her work was displayed at the Museum of Modern Art (MoMA). It was instrumental in recognizing glass as an artistic medium.

Art
Lišková is known for pioneering the use of borosilicate glass or pyrex in glass art. Borosilicate glass is traditionally used in manufacturing scientific apparatus such as test tubes and beakers.

Lišková is best known for large, abstract sculptures that are made of clear glass. Her strong yet delicate sculptures feature intricate patterns. Most of her works feature spiny, sharp designs and clean lines.

Selected works
Hanging vase 
Anthem of joy in glass
Zodiac beaker 
Verbundene Vase, auch Vasen im Ikebanastil 
Harmonie
Würfelspiel (Hrakostek)
Ram Aries
Echo

References

Women glass artists
Czechoslovak artists
1924 births
1985 deaths
Artists from Prague
Academy of Arts, Architecture and Design in Prague alumni